Edouard (Katiti) Masengo (born 1933 in Kafubu, Haut-Katanga District, Democratic Republic of the Congo - 27 March 2003) was a Congolese guitarist and singer.

In 1950 Masengo helped found JECOKE, "jeunes comiques de la Kenya". The JECOKE troop went on tour through Kenya, Uganda, Congo Brazzaville, Belgian Congo, and Cameroon, with great success, due to their  dance. A music contest was organized in Leopoldville in 1956. The winner was JECOKE, who beat out famed local artists such as Wendo Kolosoy, Grand Kalle and Franco to win.

The day before the Independence of the Democratic Republic of Congo, Masengo decided to go to Nairobi, Kenya, where he was to make several productions with such great stars as Miriam Makeba of South Africa.

Donat Muya, chief of the Lubumbashi National Museum, says that Masengo went to meet Harry Belafonte in Kingston, Jamaica . They sang Masengo's compositions as a duet, and this new fame opened the door for Masengo to get contracts to endorse the products of such firms as Coca-Cola, Ford, and Shell. However, Edouard Masengo did not forget his roots in Katanga. He returned there often to visit fellow musicians Losla Abelo and Mwenda wa Bayeke (Jean-Bosco Mwenda).

In 1972 Masengo returned for good to Lubumbashi, but was stripped of his wealth by the government in Zaire.

He died in poverty on March 27, 2003, but his musical influence lives on in such artists as Watoto Wawili, Kabwebu Kitambala, Victorina, Ndoa, Bibi Theresa, Jadotville, and others.

References

1933 births
2003 deaths
People from Haut-Katanga Province
Democratic Republic of the Congo guitarists
20th-century guitarists
21st-century Democratic Republic of the Congo people